The School of Life is an educational company that offers advice on life issues. It was founded in 2008 and has its headquarters in London and branches in, Amsterdam, Berlin, Istanbul, Paris,  São Paulo, and Taipei. The company offers a variety of educational content and services covering finding fulfilling work, mastering relationships, achieving calm, understanding and changing the world. The company also offers psychotherapy and bibliotherapy services and runs online and physical shops. The company has a channel on YouTube, with over 7 million subscribers; it publishes one new video per week.

History
The School of Life, founded by a number of writers and thinkers, including author Alain de Botton and curator Sophie Howarth, is assisted by psychotherapists, artists, and educators. The faculty includes philosophers Mark Vernon, Robert Rowland Smith, and Roman Krznaric.

Publishing
In 2016, The School of Life started its own publishing press, The School of Life Press. It has published over fifty books, some of which are mental health books for children. In 2019, a collection of the School of Life's ideas was published under the title: 'The School of Life: An Emotional Education.'

Books
 Great Thinkers (2016)
 Relationships (2017)
 How to overcome your childhood (2018)
 Anxiety (2019)
 Big Ideas for Curious Minds (2019)
 What they forgot to teach you at school (2020)
 The Good Enough Parent (2021)

Criticism 
The School of Life has been criticized for its inaccurate representations of philosophers and its weak philosophical arguments. The Los Angeles Review of Books has criticized a series of books by the School of Life as being a "vortex of jargon pitched somewhere between the banal banter of daytime talk shows and the schedule for a nightmarish New Age retreat." Professor Hans-Georg Moeller of the University of Macau has criticized the School's video on Lao Tzu, stating that it used fabricated quotes and misrepresented the Dao De Jing.

While praising the School of Life for its critiques of romanticism and efforts to foster emotional intelligence through philosophy, Jeffrey Howard argues it is less rigorous philosophy than it is "self-help for those who might need a bit more engagement with the intellect in order to consider the more complete living that comes with also employing our faculties that operate from the neck down."

References

External links
 
 The Book of Life,  online database material produced by The School of Life
 Official YouTube Channel

2008 establishments in England
Education in London
Education-related YouTube channels
Works by Alain de Botton
YouTube channels